Rhaphiptera gahani is a species of beetle in the family Cerambycidae. It was described by Gounelle in 1908. It is known from Brazil.

References

gahani
Beetles described in 1908